Ernest William Haslehust (12 November 1866 – 3 July 1949) was an English landscape painter and book illustrator who worked in watercolours.

Life and work

Haslehust was born in Walthamstow in Essex (now part of Greater London), the son of William Henry Haslehust, and studied at the Slade School of Fine Art in London under Alphonse Legros. He was a member of the Royal Institute of Painters in Water Colours (RI), Royal Society of British Artists (RBA), Royal West of England Academy (RWA) and Royal British Colonial Society of Artists (RBC), and exhibited regularly at many venues including the Royal Academy in London. He also designed posters for the LNER and LMS railway companies, and his art was featured in many magazines of the day including the Illustrated London News and The Tatler.

He was a prolific painter of British landscapes in watercolour. One book he worked on was I Wish I Could Paint (The Studio, London, 1945. 96 p., 4º) with the text by Percy Bradshaw.

Books illustrated by Haslehust

Haslehust is perhaps best remembered for illustrating 36 volumes of the well-known "Beautiful England" series of travel books published by Blackie and Son Limited (see titles below). Those marked '$' in the series "Beautiful Scotland"; the others in "Beautiful England"
Barwell, Noel. Cambridge (Blackie & Son, 1911).
Benson, George. York (Dana Estes & Co Boston).
Bradley, A. G. The English Lakes (Blackie & Son, 1910)
Danks, William. Canterbury (Blackie & Son, 1910)
Edwards, Charles & Bennett, J. H. E. Chester (Blackie & Son, 1911)
Edwards, Charles. Our Beautiful Homeland: Hereford, Chester, Oxford, Warwick & Leamington (Gresham, Ca. 1920s)
Eyre-Todd, George. Loch Lomond, Loch Katrine, and the Trossachs (Blackie & Son, 1922) $
Geddie, John. Edinburgh (Blackie & Son, 1922) $
Geddie, John. The Shores of Fife (Blackie & Son, 1922) $
Geddie, John. The Scott Country (Blackie & Son, 1922) $
Gilchrist, Murray. The Dukeries (Blackie and Son, 1913).
Gilchrist, Murray. The Peak District London Blackie, 1911.
Godfrey, Elizabeth. The New Forest (Blackie & Son, 1912).
Heath, Sidney. The Cornish Riviera (Blackie and Son, 1911).
Heath, Sidney. Winchester (Blackie & Son, 1911).
Heath, Sidney. Exeter (Blackie & Son, 1912).
Heath, Sidney. Bournemouth, Poole and Christchurch (Blackie & Son, 1915).
Heath, Sidney. The Heart of Wessex (Blackie & Son).
Heath, Sidney. Swanage and District (Blackie & Son, 1915).
Higgins, Walter. Hastings and Neighbourhood (Blackie & Son, 1920)
How, Frederick Douglas. Oxford (Blackie & Son, 1910).
Jerrold, Walter. Shakespeare Land (Dana Estes & Co. Boston).
Jerrold, Walter. Norwich and the Broads (Blackie & Son, 1910).
Jerrold, Walter. Hampton Court (Blackie & Son, 1912)
Jerrold, Walter. The Thames (Blackie & Son, 1910)
Jerrold, Walter. Folkestone and Dover (Blackie & Son, 1920).
Jerrold, Walter. The Heart of London (Blackie and Son, Ltd, 1924)
Jerrold, Walter. Through London's highways (Blackie and Son, Ltd, 1924)
Jerrold, Walter. In London's by-ways (Blackie and Son, Ltd, 1925)
Jerrold, Walter. Rambles in Greater London (Blackie and Son, Ltd, 1925)
Morley, George. Warwick and Leamington (New York: Dodge, ca. 1920).
Nicklin, J. A. Dickens Land (Blackie & Son, 1911)
Salmon, Arthur Leslie. Bath and Wells (New York Dodge Pub. Co., 1914).
Salmon, Arthur Leslie. Dartmoor (Blackie and Son, 1913).
Thomas, Edward. Windsor Castle (Dana Estes & Co. 1921).
Thomas, Edward. The Isle of Wight (Blackie & Son, 1911).
Thomas, Edward. In Pursuit of Spring (Thomas Nelson & Sons, 1914).

See also
Sidney Heath
Walter Jerrold

Notes

References

External links

E W Haslehust - short biography ("Travelling Art Gallery")
The wooded track and a young girl beside a duck pond (Watercolour - Christie's)
A West Country creek (Watercolour - Christie's)
London & North Eastern Railway poster (Travel posters online)
 
 
 

1866 births
1949 deaths
19th-century English painters
English male painters
20th-century English painters
Alumni of the Slade School of Fine Art
English illustrators
English watercolourists
Landscape artists
Members of the Royal West of England Academy
People from Walthamstow
20th-century English male artists
19th-century English male artists